The Cacho Negro Volcano, in Spanish the , which translates as Black Horn Volcano is an inactive volcano in Costa Rica, situated in the Cordillera Central range near the Barva Volcano and within the Braulio Carrillo National Park.

Toponymy 

Previously known as Arenales Volcano, the current name is due to the similarity with a bovine horn.

Physical aspects 

Located 9km north from Barva Volcano, and part of its complex. The crater is open at the northwest side.  There is a parasitic cone towards the south side. Area is of around 30 km2.

Volcanic activity 

There is secondary volcanic activity with hot springs, but due to the difficult access, their precise source hasn't been determined.

References 

Stratovolcanoes of Costa Rica
Mountains of Costa Rica
Inactive volcanoes